Parang, officially the Municipality of Parang (Maguindanaon: Inged nu Parang, Jawi: ايڠايد نو ڤارڠ; Iranun: Inged a Parang, ايڠايد ا ڤارڠ), is a 1st class municipality in the province of Maguindanao del Norte, Philippines. According to the 2020 census, it has a population of 102,914 people.

The town was part of the province of Shariff Kabunsuan from October 2006 until its nullification by the Supreme Court in July 2008.

History
The history of Parang traces back to the era when it used to be an integral part of the Maguindanao Sultanate. In June 1851, the Spanish military government based in Zamboanga sent forces to Polloc, presently a barangay of Parang, and seized it. Having a natural deep water harbor, the Spanish then set up a fortress and a naval base at Polloc, from which they would launch military operations against the Moros of the Pulangui Valley.

Polloc eventually grew into a small town that by 1860 it was home to 600 Christians and 50-60 Chinese traders along with people from other walks of life. In 1884, a road was built between Polloc and the other town of Cotabato, which was founded ten years later than Polloc in 1861 and now served as the capital of the 5th Military District of Cotabato in which Polloc was part of.

The Americans took over local affairs when the Spanish evacuated at the aftermath of the Philippine-American War in 1901 and the American authorities replaced them. When political reorganization of the Philippine islands took place in 1917, Polloc was made part of the newly created municipal district of Parang. Parang as a municipality was created on August 18, 1947, through Executive Order No. 82 signed by President Manuel Roxas. The modern Polloc Port, which form the main part of the present-day Polloc Freeport and Economic Zone currently based in Barangay Polloc of Parang town, was constructed in 1977 and currently serves as the primary transshipment port in the Bangsamoro region.

Geography
It is bordered to the north by Barira and Matanog, on the east by Buldon, and on the south is Sultan Kudarat.

Barangays
Parang is politically subdivided into 25 barangays.

Climate

Demographics

Economy

Tourism
A cultural festival is held every August 18 in commemoration of the founding anniversary of Parang. Events are organized by the municipal government with the participation of various stakeholders

Tourist attractions in Parang include:
Golf course in Camp S.K Pendatun
Zone Beach
Punta Beach
White Sand Beach in Limbayan, Bonggo Island
Molina-Munoz Farm Resort
Fruit Bats Sanctuary
Bacolod street 
Simento white camp

Infrastructure

Transportation
Major sea cargo vessels connect Polloc Port to Manila and other Philippine cities.

Tricycles are the main modes of public transport in the municipality. Several shuttle vans and PUJs provide regular trips to Cotabato City and other municipalities.

Health
1 District Hospital
1 Rural Health Unit 
1 Private Hospital
1 Medical/Dental Hospital(PNP)
1 Medical Diagnostic Laboratory

Utilities
Magelco (Maguindanao Electric Cooperative, Inc.) provides electric power to the locality. Inland barangays use solar power as installed by our donor agencies.

Education
Tertiary:  3 private schools
Secondary:  5 public schools;3 private schools
Elementary:  14 public schools;4 private schools
Primary:  14 public schools
Pre-School:  2 public schools;5 private schools

Sister Cities

 Cotabato City, Philippines

References

External links
   Parang Profile at the DTI Cities and Municipalities Competitive Index
 [ Philippine Standard Geographic Code]
Philippine Census Information
Local Governance Performance Management System

Municipalities of Maguindanao del Norte
Port cities and towns in the Philippines
Populated places established in 1947
1947 establishments in the Philippines
Establishments by Philippine executive order